Dave van Vuuren (born 1990, Westville, Durban, South Africa) is a South African singer-songwriter and guitarist. He first gained popularity through winning the seventh season of Idols South Africa after a close public vote in the finale held on 4 October 2011, with Van Vuuren getting 50.49% of the votes, against 49.51% for the other finalist and eventual runner-up Mark Haze. He was the first series winner who came back after landing in the bottom 3 in earlier performance.

Before Idols
David fronted a South African underground Metal-Core band called Freedom for Your Life.

Idols Controversy

Unable to embrace the pop star mould, and unsettled by the post-Idols album he had to record, he soon went his own way. David was invited to perform on the finale of the eighth season of Idols as is a tradition when the new Idols winner gets announced. In a move to try and shake the Idols image, and as a rebellious act against his label, David and his band Free the Animals went on live national television before Khaya Mthethwa was announced the winner of the new season and performed an original, Progressive Rock song called "Feels Like the Ocean" which spanned 6 minutes.

David and his band had rehearsed with the Idols production team two days prior with a different song chosen by the label. Without telling a soul, they went on stage and wreaked Rock n' Roll havoc upon the stage in front of a live television audience. The video of the performance was completely removed off the internet the next day by M-Net, but over 3 million people saw it that night on live TV.

After Idols

After releasing a compulsory, post-Idols record through Universal Music, he then toured Southern Africa extensively as a solo acoustic artist, releasing an independent, fully original and self-funded folk EP, entitled "The Raging Sea" in the process.

David has since gone on to form a critically acclaimed Rock band called Southern Wild. They have played at some of Southern Africa's most prestigious festivals including Oppikoppi, Rocking The Daisies, Up The Creek and STRAB. They were chosen as one of four Deezer Next artists for South Africa in 2017 and released their debut album a few weeks later in May. The album is titled, "Lead Role in a Classic Horror". It was recorded by Raiven Hunter at Popsicle Studios in Woodstock, Cape Town and has gone on to be streamed over 1,000,000 times on Deezer, in countries such as Germany, the United Kingdom, the United States of America, Brazil, France, Australia and South Africa.

His band Southern Wild has since opened for Incubus on their "8" world tour and more recently opened for The Cure in South Africa. Southern Wild is now signed to Bellville Records, a famous studio run and owned by South African musician Theo Crous of Springbok Nude Girls and Kobus!. Bellville Studios has produced many famous records from South African artists including Karen Zoid, Arno Carstens, Prime Circle, Hog Hoggidy Hog, Chris Chameleon, Parlotones, Fokofpolisiekar, Dan Patlansky and more. His band is currently recording their highly anticipated second album at the legendary studios, with no release date announced as of yet.

Discography

Singles
2011: "Hall of Mirrors"
2017: "Time Eraser"
2017: "Lead Role"
2017: "In a Classic Horror"

Albums
2011: Free The Animals
2013: The Raging Sea EP
2017: Lead Role in a Classic Horror
Track listing
Disc 1:
Track 1 – You Will Leave A Mark	 3:26
	
Track 2 – Hall of Mirrors	 3:47	

Track 3 – Utopia (Find Me)	 3:52	

Track 4 – Lovers Fight to the End	 3:40
	
Track 5 – Killing The Innocence	 3:15	

Track 6 – Soul Boy	 4:38	

Track 7 – Amazing	 3:18	

Track 8 – Troublesome Mind	 3:19	

Track 9 – Never Say Never	 3:49	

Track 10 – If We Don't Fear	 4:12	

Track 11 – Streets of Philadelphia	 3:44	

Disc 2:

Track 1 – Vincent	 2:44	

Track 2 – The Blower's Daughter	 3:48	

Track 3 – Day Old Hate	 3:58	

Track 4 – Cowgirl in the Sand	 3:43	

Track 5 – I Shall Be Released	 2:41

Track 6 – Swing Low, Sweet Chariot 2:53

2017: Southern Wild, Lead Role in a Classic Horror
Track listing

Track 1 – Intro (The People)

Track 2 – The People

Track 3 – Time Eraser

Track 4 – Lead Role

Track 5 – In a Classic Horror

Track 6 – Darkness at My Heels (Live in Studio)

Track 7 – I'm So Happy I Could Die

Track 8 – Dirt Horse

Track 9 – Emotion Electric Love

Track 10 – Feels Like The Ocean

References

21st-century South African male singers
Idols South Africa winners
1990 births
Living people
Singers from Johannesburg